Zetobora is a genus of cockroaches belonging to the family Blaberidae.

The species of this genus are found in America.

Species:
 Zetobora aberrans Giglio-Tos, 1898 
 Zetobora ampla (Hebard, 1921)

Homonyms
Two other entomologists are used the name "Zetobora" for different genera of Blaberidae. Namely:
Zetobora Brunner von Wattenwyl, 1865 accepted as Lanxoblatta Hebard, 1931 
Zetobora Saussure, 1862 accepted as Laxta Walker, 1868

References

Blaberidae
Blattodea genera